The 2002–03 Sporting de Gijón season was the fifth consecutive season of the club in Segunda División after its last relegation from La Liga.

Overview
On 7 October 2002, Pepe Acebal was sacked as manager, after earning only two points in the first five games. Antonio Maceda replaced him and, despite not winning any game until the round 11, he managed the team until the end of the season.

On 7 March 2003, due to the incidents during the match against Numancia at El Molinón, the Spanish Committee of Sporting Discipline agreed the closure of the stadium for one game. This match, played against Almería, on 7 June 2003 at Antonio Amilivia stadium in León. was the first one of Real Sporting played as home team out of El Molinón.

Squad

From the youth squad

Competitions

Segunda División

Results by round

League table

Matches

Copa del Rey

Matches

Squad statistics

Appearances and goals

|-
|colspan="14"|Players who appeared for Sporting de Gijón no longer at the club:

|}

References

External links
Profile at BDFutbol
Official website

Sporting de Gijón seasons
Sporting de Gijon